House on Hill is an album by American pianist and composer Brad Mehldau released on the Nonesuch label in 2006. The album was mainly recorded at the sessions which produced Anything Goes (2004) and is the first album entirely composed by Mehldau since Places (2000).

Reception

AllMusic awarded the album three stars out of five and in its review by Thom Jurek stated, "While this set is nowhere near as full of surprises as Day Is Done, it is nonetheless another chapter in the development of a singular composer and pianist". The Guardian 's John Fordham gave it a 4 star rating and observed, "Mehldau's originals tend to be more private, enigmatic and, in some ways, classical than his imports, but the playing is typically mesmerising, those characteristic overlapping, interrogating left-right lines as vivaciously engaged as ever". On All About Jazz, Troy Collins noted, "Although House On Hill may not rise to the conceptual highs of Day Is Done, it is an impressive document from an artist who continues to refine himself". JazzTimes reviewer, Steve Greenlee commented, "As much as Ballard has stepped to the plate since Rossy’s departure, House on Hill is a reminder that Mehldau’s first trio was one amazing outfit". The album also received a "CHOC de l'ANNEE" from the French magazine "Jazzman".

Track listing 
All compositions by Brad Mehldau
 "August Ending" - 7:00  
 "House on Hill" - 8:13  
 "Bealtine" - 9:20  
 "Boomer" - 7:17  
 "Backyard" - 5:44  
 "Fear and Trembling" - 5:26  
 "Embers" - 8:07  
 "Happy Tune" - 8:54  
 "Waiting for Eden" - 7:32

Personnel 
Brad Mehldau – piano
Larry Grenadier – bass 
Jorge Rossy – drums

Credits 
Produced by Brad Mehldau and Matt Pierson
Recorded and Mixed by James Farber 
Mastering by Greg Calbi 
Artwork by Benita Raphan
Photography by Lourdes Delgado

References 

Nonesuch Records albums
Brad Mehldau albums
2006 albums
Albums produced by Matt Pierson